The following is a list of all past and present members of the European Court of Justice in the official order of precedence:

As of 7 October 2021:

Sources 

Current members, European Court of Justice.
Former members, European Court of Justice.

Court of Justice of the European Union
European Court of Justice

European Union-related lists
Lists of European Union people